Iran participated in the 2010 Winter Paralympics, in Vancouver, British Columbia, Canada. Only one athlete represented Iran in the 2010 Paralympics in alpine skiing.

Competitors

Results by event

Alpine skiing 

Men's standing

References

External links
Vancouver 2010 Paralympic Games official website
International Paralympic Committee official website

Nations at the 2010 Winter Paralympics
2010
Paralympics